Košarkaški klub Železničar Čačak, commonly referred to as KK Železničar Čačak, is a men's professional basketball club based in Čačak, Serbia. The club currently participates in the Second League of Serbia.

Former Železničar player Aleksandar Nikolić, later a professional coach and a "father" of Serbian basketball, was inducted into the FIBA Hall of Fame and Basketball Hall of Fame as a coach. Also many famous players and coaches started their basketball careers in Želeničar, such as Dragan Kićanović, Željko Obradović, Radisav Ćurčić.

Players

Coaches 

  Željko Bugarčić (2016–2019)
  Branko Jorović (2019–2020)
  Aleksandar Bjelić (2020–present)

See also 
 KK Borac Čačak
 KK Čačak 94
 KK Mladost Čačak

References

External links 
 Team profile on Eurobasket
 Team profile on Srbijasport
Team website on kkzeleznicarcacak.rs

Železničar
Železničar
Sport in Čačak
Star
Star